Pathankot Junction railway station (station code: PTK) is a located in Pathankot district in the Indian state of Punjab and serves Pathankot.

The railway station

Here is a short description of the station by Ian Manning: "Pathankot, being the railhead for Kashmir and several other places (a branch has been inching into Kashmir for some time, but so far it hasn’t made much difference) is a dusty trucking and military town, booming and rough. Its station grew by accumulation in length rather than in breadth, with some rather confused bay platforms at the Amritsar end. The contrasting tidy bay and loop at the far end were the passenger terminus of the Kangra Valley Railway, a  line which penetrated into the foothills of the Himalayas.".

History
The -long  broad gauge Amritsar–Pathankot line was opened in 1884.

The -long -wide narrow-gauge Kangra Valley Railway from Pathankot to Joginder Nagar was commissioned in 1929.

The line from Jalandhar City to Mukerian was constructed in 1915. The Mukerian–Pathankot line was built in 1952, The construction of the Pathankot–Jammu Tawi line was initiated in 1965, after the Indo-Pakistani War of 1965, and opened in 1971.

Electrification
Electrification work of the Jalandhar–Jammu line is completed as of May 2015 and now functioning.

References

External links
Trains at Pathankot Junction

Railway stations in Pathankot district
Firozpur railway division
Railway stations in India opened in 1884
Transport in Pathankot